MD Data is a magneto-optical medium succeeding MiniDisc. Sony wanted it to replace floppy disks, but instead came the Zip drive, CD writers, and memory sticks and cards.

Overview
The technology has 140 MB of data storage, but it is slow and expensive. It is in products such as a still camera, a document scanner, and in late 1990s 4- and 8-track multitrack recording decks. Meant as a step up from the popular 4-track cassette-based studios, these recorders enjoyed a brief prominence before they were replaced by relatively affordable and far more flexible direct-to-hard drive recording on Windows and Macintosh based computers. The format lacks an affordable computer drive. Some examples of products that used the format are a few multitrack "portastudio"-style audio recorders such as Sony's MDM-X4 and Tascam's 564.

MD Data2 

In 1997, Sony introduced the MD Data2 format at 650 MB. The only product that used the format was Sony's DCM-M1 camcorder (capable of still images and MPEG-2 video).

Hi-MD 
Since 2004, Hi-MD allows 340MB or 1GB of any type of data to be stored on a Hi-MD formatted MiniDisc, succeeding MD Data and MD Data2.

Gallery

See also
 MiniDisc
 Hi-MD

References

External links
 MiniDisc Data Product table

Optical computer storage
Computer-related introductions in 1993
Sony products